Gerard McCarthy (born 31 March 1981) is an actor from Belfast, Northern Ireland.

Biography
McCarthy was born in Belfast and attended St. Mary's Christian Brothers' Grammar School. They came out as non-binary in 2022 & now use they/them pronouns.

Career
Gerard McCarthy was awarded Sir Kenneth Branagh's Renaissance Scholarship to train at Laine Theatre Arts, graduating in 2002.

They currently play Kevin McSwain in BBC 2's BAFTA nominated drama The Fall, starring Gillian Anderson.

On Netflix, they can be seen alongside Sir Derek Jacobi, Neve Campbell and Joely Richardson as Ashley Stokes in Titanic: Blood & Steel, an epic 12-part series charting the extraordinary construction of RMS Titanic in the shipyards of Edwardian Belfast. The series was nominated for 5 IFTA Awards including Best Series.

They played Brondsted in the first episode of Michael Hirst's History Channel series Vikings, starring Gabriel Byrne.

McCarthy also played Rory Thompson in Samson Films' Belonging to Laura, a modern-day adaptation of Oscar Wilde's Lady Windermere's Fan directed by Karl Golden, which was nominated for Best Single Drama at the IFTA Awards.

McCarthy is known for their award-winning performance as Kris Fisher on the Channel 4 soap opera Hollyoaks from 2006 to 2010, for which they were nominated in the Best Newcomer category at the British Soap Awards and the National Television Awards.

On stage, McCarthy made their Shakespearean debut as Fenton in The Merry Wives of Windsor at Shakespeare's Globe in London. The production received widespread critical acclaim and subsequently transferred to New York and Los Angeles with McCarthy reprising their role in both cities. 2012 also saw them return to the stage in a highly acclaimed production of Joe Penhall's Olivier Award-winning play Blue/Orange.

They recently filmed the BBC comedy Puppy Love, written by and starring Joanna Scanlan and Vicki Pepperdine (co-creators of the BAFTA nominated Getting On), and returned to the stage at the end of 2014 in the world premiere of Jonathan Harker and Dracula

McCarthy's debut feature film, A Nightingale Falling, premiered at the 2014 Galway Film Fleadh.

In 2015 McCarthy returned to their homeland with the one-man show Cat - The Play by Richard Hardwick and Jamie Beamish before commencing a national tour of Jonathan Harvey's Beautiful Thing, in which they played Tony. Shortly after, he played George Bailey in the UK premiere of It's a Wonderful Life at Penge's Bridgehouse Theatre, directed by Guy Retallack.

2016 saw McCarthy return to Hollyoaks as a member of the core writing team, he then reprised their role of Kevin McSwain in season 3 of The Fall.

Most recently, McCarthy played the leading role of David Hothouse in the UK premiere of Stalking The Bogeyman. The production received widespread critical and public acclaim with McCarthy receiving a Best Actor nomination at the Off West End Awards.

In 2017, McCarthy has played Emmett Forrest in Leicester Curve's production of Legally Blonde at the Opera Garnier in Monte Carlo.

In 2018, they joined the cast of the BBC drama Call the Midwife as Terry Davidson, before playing Erwin Bach in the original West End cast of Tina, The Musical at the Aldwych Theatre, London.

In 2020, McCarthy filmed the role of Bobby Frank in Belfast, written and directed by Kenneth Branagh and starring Caitriona Balfe, Judi Dench, Jamie Dornan & Ciaran Hinds, and in 2021, Just Johnny, a short film written by McCarthy, was filmed on location in Northern Ireland, directed by Terry Loane.

Charity work
McCarthy began their association with the Northern Ireland Children's Hospice in October 2007 when they overcame their fear of heights by leading a fundraising abseil event, in which they had to climb down Belfast's Europa Hotel. They then became a celebrity supporter of The White Sapphire Ball in aid of the NI Children's Hospice, which auctioned off a romantic dinner with McCarthy for £4,500. In December 2009, they took part in a celebrity version of Panic Attack and won £1000 for the NI Children's Hospice. 

In January 2010, McCarthy led the Belfast4Haiti 5K run in their home city with Olympic gold medallist Dame Mary Peters. The event was organised to raise funds for victims of the Haiti earthquake.

References

External links
 
 

Living people
1981 births
Male soap opera actors from Northern Ireland
Male stage actors from Northern Ireland
Male film actors from Northern Ireland
People educated at St. Mary's Christian Brothers' Grammar School, Belfast
Male actors from Belfast
British television presenters
21st-century male actors from Northern Ireland
Male Shakespearean actors from Northern Ireland
LGBT actors from Northern Ireland
Non-binary people from Northern Ireland
Non-binary actors